Void Terra Firma is the second album by American thrash metal band Defiance, released in 1990. It was the first album to feature vocalist Steev Esquivel. It was advertised as being recorded "Live and in Your Face!"

This is Defiance's best known album, as it features their cover of Iron Maiden's "Killers".

Track listing
"Void Terra Firma" (05:25)  
"Deception of Faith" (04:28)  
"Questions" (04:58)
"Skitz-Illusions" (03:26) 
"Slayground" (03:30)
"Killers" (04:42) (Iron Maiden cover) 
"Steamroller" (03:23)
"Checkmate" (03:39)
"Buried or Burned" (03:22) 
"Last Resort (Welcome to Poverty)" (03:16)

Re-release bonus tracks 
Violent Remedy (Void) – (live)
Skitz-Illusions
Checkmate
Deception of Faith
Checkmate – (live)
Drum Solo-Lockjaw – (live)
The Fault – (live)

Personnel
Steev Esquivel – lead vocals
Doug Harrington – guitars
Jim Adams – guitars
Mike Kaufmann – bass
Matt Vander Ende – drums

References

1990 albums
Defiance (band) albums
Roadrunner Records albums